Claus Rasmussen (born 31 December 1957) is a Danish former cyclist. He competed in the 1000m time trial event at the 1984 Summer Olympics.

References

External links
 

1957 births
Living people
Danish male cyclists
Olympic cyclists of Denmark
Cyclists at the 1984 Summer Olympics
People from Svendborg
Sportspeople from the Region of Southern Denmark